The following is a list of seasons completed by the Kent State Golden Flashes women's basketball program at Kent State University in Kent, Ohio, United States. The team was established in 1973 as a club team and in 1975 as a varsity team, playing their first official game in January 1976. The Flashes play at the Division I level of the National Collegiate Athletic Association (NCAA) as members of the Mid-American Conference (MAC) East Division. Kent State began play in the MAC in 1981, the first year the MAC started sponsoring women's athletics. Since 1977, the team has played home games at the Memorial Athletic and Convocation Center. Through the 2017–18 season, the Golden Flashes have won five Mid-American Conference regular-season championships, three MAC tournament titles, and eight MAC East Division titles. In post-season play, the program has made five appearances in the NCAA tournament along with four appearances in the Women's National Invitation Tournament (WNIT).

References

 
Kent State
Kent State Golden Flashes basketball seasons